Tanya Franck  (born 13 December 1974) is a Canadian soccer player who played as a midfielder for the Canada women's national soccer team. She was part of the team at the 1999 FIFA Women's World Cup.

References

External links
 
 
 Nebraska profile

1974 births
Living people
Canadian women's soccer players
Canada women's international soccer players
Soccer players from Toronto
Sportspeople from North York
1999 FIFA Women's World Cup players
Women's association football midfielders
Denver Diamonds players
USL W-League (1995–2015) players